Kent Angelo Hill (born March 7, 1957) is a former American football offensive lineman who played nine seasons in the National Football League (NFL), mainly for the Los Angeles Rams. He was selected to five Pro Bowls.  He was selected in the first round of the 1979 NFL draft out of Georgia Tech.

Following retirement from professional football, Hill was director of student athlete development at Georgia Tech from 1989 to 1998. In later years he was a corporate personnel development consultant.

References

1957 births
Living people
American football offensive guards
Georgia Tech Yellow Jackets football players
Houston Oilers players
Los Angeles Rams players
National Conference Pro Bowl players
People from Sumter County, Georgia
Players of American football from Georgia (U.S. state)
Ed Block Courage Award recipients